Bobrynetskyi Raion was a raion (district) of the Kirovohrad Oblast in central Ukraine. It covered an area of 1496 square kilometres. The administrative center of the raion was the city of Bobrynets. The raion was established in 1939. The raion was abolished on 18 July 2020 as part of the administrative reform of Ukraine, which reduced the number of raions of Kirovohrad Oblast to four. The area of Bobrynets Raion was merged into Kropyvnytskyi Raion.

At the time of disestablishment, the raion consisted of two hromadas: 
 Bobrynets urban hromada with the administration in Bobrynets;
 Ketrysanivka rural hromada with the administration in the selo of Ketrysanivka.

References

Former raions of Kirovohrad Oblast
1939 establishments in the Soviet Union
Ukrainian raions abolished during the 2020 administrative reform